Sofía Ester Cuthbert Chiarleoni (Iquique, 28 November 1918 – Buenos Aires, 30 September 1974) was the wife of the Chilean General Carlos Prats, murdered along with him in Argentina by the Dirección de Inteligencia Nacional, within the framework of Operation Condor.

She was the daughter of the marriage of William Cuthbert Lister and Sofía Chiarleoni Méndez. She completed her studies at the Iquique English College where she graduated with the title of Executive Bilingual Secretary.

In Iquique, she married Carlos Prats on January 19, 1944. They had three daughters- Sofía Ester, who has been ambassador of Chile to Greece, María Angélica, and Hilda Cecilia.

She was murdered alongside her husband by a car bomb in Buenos Aires, where they lived in exile, on 30 September 1974.

References

1918 births
1974 deaths
1974 murders in Argentina
People from Iquique
Assassinated Chilean people
Chilean people murdered abroad
Chilean terrorism victims
Deaths by car bomb
People killed in Operation Condor
People murdered in Argentina
Presidency of Salvador Allende
Terrorism deaths in Argentina
Female murder victims